Rev is a 7% ABV vodka-based cola beverage (alcopop), infused with guarana. Malt beverage versions are also available in cans instead of plastic bottles. Rev was originally manufactured by FBM Distilleries in Brampton, Ontario, Canada, but is currently also marketed as a malt-based beverage by the Geloso Group and distributed exclusively within Canada under license from Bacardi. The malt version is currently available in 3 flavours in Quebec: Original ("Blue"), Watermelon + Grapefruit ("Red"), and Mulberry ("Purple"). The Mulberry flavour is sold only in Quebec, with all over flavours being available in all other provinces. The vodka based flavours, which are not produced by the Geloso Group, are available in red and blue (original) flavours. inRev Low, a purple, low calorie flavour of the drink, Rev Factor, as well as green and yellow flavours have been discontinued. The drink is sold in packs of four  bottles, single  or  bottles, and  cans.

Rev was introduced in April, 2000, as a beverage marketed towards rave and nightclub culture.

Rev-Bomb
Rev when combined with Jägermeister makes a drink called a "Rev-Bomb", a variation of a Jägerbomb. This drink is a "depth charge" or "bomb shot", which refers to cocktails that are made by dropping a shot glass filled with liquor into another drink.

In popular culture
Canadian indie rock band Alvvays titled their third studio album, Blue Rev (2022), after the drink.

See also
Alcoholic beverage
Alcoholism
Comparison of alcopops
Hangover
Legal drinking age
Wine cooler

References

Products introduced in 2000
Alcopops
Canadian alcoholic drinks